Necesito de Ti (I need you) is a studio album released by Mexican singer Vicente Fernández on July 7, 2009 by Sony BMG. The album earned the Grammy Award for Best Regional Mexican Album.

Track listing

Charts

Weekly charts

Year-end charts

Sales and certifications

References

External links
  official website Vicente Fernández
 [] Necesito de Ti on allmusic.com
  Necesito de Ti on itunes.apple.com

2010 albums
Vicente Fernández albums
Spanish-language albums
Sony BMG Norte albums
Latin Grammy Award for Best Ranchero/Mariachi Album